Bugajski (feminine: Bugajska; plural: Bugajscy) is a Polish-language surname associated with any of locations named Bugaj.  Notable people with this surname include:
 Adam Bugajski (born 1974), Polish civil servant
 Janusz Bugajski (born 1954), American advisor
 Josh Bugajski (born 1990), British rower
 Ryszard Bugajski (1943–2019), Polish filmmaker

See also
 
Bugaj (surname)

Polish-language surnames
Polish toponymic surnames